Noonamah is an outer rural suburban area of Darwin. it is 45 km southeast of the Darwin CBD. Its Local Government Area is the Litchfield Municipality. The suburb is mostly a rural area, but has been experiencing strong growth in population and development.  The Elizabeth River flows through Noonamah towards the East Arm of Darwin Harbour.

History
The name of the locality was applied in 1941. "Noonamah" was taken from the language of the Wagaman Aboriginal people and means "plenty of tucker and good things".

In 1942, a railway siding and storage depot were constructed on the North Australia Railway at the site of present-day Noonamah, to support the Strauss Airfield  and a number of nearby military airfields being established in the area.  A cricket pitch was built by members of the 27th Australian Infantry Brigade in the same year while stationed at the camp. The cricket pitch has hosted games between local residents and serving personnel on ANZAC Day many times since the war, and is now heritage listed. Noonamah and surrounding areas were bombed by the Japanese extensively throughout 1942.

The North Australia Railway was only able to be sustained after the war by the activities of the Frances. Creek Iron Ore Mine.  The Railway eventually closed in 1976 due to the insistence of the then Whitlam Federal Government that the Mine paid commercial rates to use the Railway. The Mine then closed, and, with it, the Railway.  The Adelaide-Darwin Railway opened in 2004, but on a new alignment that bypasses Noonamah.

Today
Modern Noonamah is mostly a rural area with much of the surrounding land being used for agriculture. There is a hotel, petrol station and general store (which also serves as the Post Office RV) located on the Stuart Highway south of the Elizabeth River bridge. North of the river is the Darwin Crocodile Farm, a commercial farm with over 7000 American alligators and native crocodiles. The farm is currently closed to the public.  A number of trucking companies have facilities in the suburb for loading and transporting livestock.

There are no schools in the suburb. The nearest primary school is to the north in Bees Creek, while middle school and high school students in years 7 to 12 can travel to Taminmin High School in nearby Humpty Doo.

Public transport
The Northern Territory Government provides limited bus services between Noonamah and Palmerston Monday - Saturday. Bus routes 440 and 445 pass through the suburb. These services are infrequent, generally running twice a day. In January 2012, park and ride facilities opened in nearby Coolalinga and Humpty Doo, providing a better service for commuters travelling from the rural area to Darwin.

Events
The National Rodeo Council of Australia schedules many events in Noonamah throughout the year.

The Noonamah Tavern Rodeo

References

External links

Suburbs of Darwin, Northern Territory